Mycostigma is a genus of fungi in the family Atheliaceae. The genus is monotypic, containing the single species Mycostigma aegeritoides, found in Europe.

References

External links

Atheliales
Taxa named by Walter Jülich
Fungi described in 1976